Bucecea is a town in Botoșani County, Western Moldavia, Romania. It administers two villages, Bohoghina and Călinești.

References

Populated places in Botoșani County
Localities in Western Moldavia
Towns in Romania
Monotowns in Romania
Shtetls